Sheng Peng (born 9 February 1989) is a Chinese football player.

Club career
Sheng was promoted to Shaanxi Chanba's first team squad in 2007. On 2 November 2011, he made his Chinese Super League debut in a 2–2 draw against Qingdao Jonoon.
In March 2016, Sheng transferred to China League Two side Heilongjiang Lava Spring.

Career statistics
Statistics accurate as of match played 31 December 2020.

Honours

Club
Guizhou Renhe
Chinese FA Cup: 2013
 Chinese FA Super Cup: 2014

References

1989 births
Living people
Chinese footballers
Footballers from Jiangsu
Beijing Renhe F.C. players
Heilongjiang Ice City F.C. players
Inner Mongolia Zhongyou F.C. players
Chinese Super League players
China League One players
China League Two players
Sportspeople from Xuzhou
Association football goalkeepers
21st-century Chinese people